Marioara is a Romanian female given name derived from Maria:

Marioara Popescu, a Romanian Olympics rower
Marioara Munteanu, a Romanian female weightlifter
Marioara Murărescu, a Romanian singer and producer of folkloric television shows
Marioara Trașcă, a retired Romanian rower
Marioara Trifan, an American pianist and conductor

See also
Maria (disambiguation)
Maricica

Romanian feminine given names